Odobești is a commune in Dâmbovița County, Muntenia, Romania with a population of 5,183 people (2011 census). It is composed of five villages: Brâncoveanu, Crovu, Miulești, Odobești and Zidurile.

References

Communes in Dâmbovița County
Localities in Muntenia